Farmersville is a city in Collin County, Texas, United States. The population was 3,612 at the 2020 census.

History

Farmersville originated in 1849 as a settlement on the Jefferson-McKinney Road, and near Republic of Texas National Road. The settlement was named by pioneers William Pickney Chapman & John Hendrex for their chief occupation.  After 1854, the Yearys and their neighbors of Sugar Hill (2 miles northeast) began relocating here. H.M. Markham, practicing here by 1855, is said to have been Collin County's earliest physician. The first Methodist Church was organized in 1856. William Gotcher on March 4, 1859, donated land for the public square. A school was operating as early as the 1860s. The first Baptist Church was organized on May 14, 1865.

The town was incorporated on June 2, 1873. First mayor: John S. Rike. Aldermen: James Church, Ben King, John Murchison, Tom Tatum, John P. Utt. Marshall: Jeff Hines.

Institutions from the 1880s that are still in operation include the Farmersville Times,  which is the oldest newspaper in Collin County, and the First Bank, as well as the two churches mentioned above.

On June 15, 1945, Audie Murphy, the most decorated soldier of World War II, came home to a hero's welcome in Farmersville. Thousand's filled the square to listen to a speech given by him, and the event was noted in the July 16, 1945 edition of Life Magazine. A Texas Historical Commission plaque notes the event on the square.

As the town became a trade center, agriculture kept pace. Farmersville in the 1930s was known as the "Onion Capital of North Texas", annually shipping over 1,000 carloads of onions. Along with some small industry, cattle, cotton, and maize crops remain important.

On May 8, 2021, in honor of Audie Murphy, the most decorated soldier of WWII, a "Sister City Pact" with Holtzwihr, France was signed. This ceremony was to announce the common bond between the two cities and recognize Murphy's heroism at the Battle of Holtzwihr on January 26, 1945.

Geography
U.S. Route 380 crosses the south side of the city, leading west  to McKinney and east  to Greenville. Texas State Highway 78 passes through the west side of Farmersville, leading north  to Blue Ridge and southwest  to Garland.

Climate
The climate in this area is characterized by hot, humid summers and generally mild to cool winters.  According to the Köppen Climate Classification system, Farmersville has a humid subtropical climate, abbreviated "Cfa" on climate maps.

Demographics 

As of the 2020 United States census, there were 3,612 people, 1,396 households, and 799 families residing in the city.

Education
The city is served by the Farmersville Independent School District.  Collin College operates a branch campus in Farmersville.

Media
The Farmersville Times is a weekly newspaper published in the city. The newspaper was established in 1885, and is part of C&S Media Publications Inc.

Notable people

 Stevie Benton, bassist for American heavy metal band Drowning Pool, resided in Farmersville and attended Farmersville High School
 Herb Ellis (1921–2010), jazz guitarist, born in Farmersville
 Monty "Hawkeye" Henson, three-time world champion rodeo cowboy, born in Farmersville
 John Monroe (baseball), was an infielder in Major League Baseball for the New York Giants and Philadelphia Phillies
 Loren Murchison, winner of two Olympic gold medals
 Audie Murphy, United States' most decorated combat soldier of World War II, spent his childhood in Kingston, Texas and surrounding areas
 Tex Watson, murderer and member of the Manson Family, best known for his involvement in the murder of Sharon Tate and her unborn child, grew up in Copeville but attended Farmersville Independent School District
 Bart Barber, pastor of First Baptist Church of Farmersville, elected 64th President of the Southern Baptist Convention

References

External links

 City of Farmersville official website
 Texas State Historical Association

Dallas–Fort Worth metroplex
Cities in Texas
Cities in Collin County, Texas
Populated places established in 1849
1849 establishments in Texas